A prayer cloth is a sacramental used by Christians, in continuation with the practice of the early Church, as recorded in the Acts of the Apostles:

Prayer cloths are especially popular within the Pentecostal tradition of Christianity, although communicants of other Christian denominations use them as well. Among Lebanese Christians, prayer cloths are blessed and then placed on an afflicted area, while believers pray to God through the intercession of Saint Sharbel. Among Methodists and Pentecostals, if a Christian is suffering from an illness and is not present during a church service, a prayer cloth is consecrated through prayer and then taken to the sick individual.

See also 

Anointing of the Sick
Blessed salt
Christian headcovering
Cross necklace
Holy anointing oil
Holy water
Home altar
Tallit

References 

Christian practices
Sacramentals